KPackage was KDE's package manager frontend.

It supported BSD, Debian, Gentoo, RPM and Slackware packages. It provided a GUI for the management and upgrade of existing packages and the installation and acquirement of new packages. Additionally, it provided functionality to help manage package caches. KPackage was part of kdeadmin, and was developed at KDE.org.

See also 
 PackageKit
 Synaptic (software)
 Ubuntu Software Center

References

External links 
 KPackage user wiki

KDE software
Linux PMS graphical front-ends
Package management software that uses Qt
Software update managers